The Environment Institute at the University of Adelaide brings together research groups in fields of science, engineering and economics relating to the management and use of natural resources and infrastructure. Research undertaken within the Institute aims to contribute to improvements in the management of natural resources including water, soil, land and native flora and fauna, particularly under changing climate and economic conditions. It was launched on the eve of World Environment Day, 4 June 2009.

The mission of the Environment Institute is to develop practical solutions to difficult problems by bringing together the best people from science, government and the wider community. As of 2014, the Institute consists of five centres, a laboratory and two programs.

Directorship 

The inaugural Executive Director of the Environment Institute was economist Mike Young. He was succeeded by Professor Bob Hill in 2013. Professor Bronwyn Gillanders is the Deputy Director of the institute.

Notable scientists 
Professor Barry Brook was the inaugural Sir Hubert Wilkins Chair of Climate Change at the University of Adelaide. He co-directed the Global Ecology Laboratory with Professor Corey Bradshaw who succeeded him as Sir Hubert Wilkins Chair of Climate Change. The Environment Institute's Deputy Director, Professor Bronwyn Gillanders, is also the Director of the Marine Biology program and director of the Spencer Gulf Research & Development Initiative.

Research centres, laboratories & programs
The Australian Centre for Ancient DNA (ACAD) undertakes research on the evolution and environmental change across time through the use of preserved genetic records from human, animal, plant and sedimentary remains.
The Australian Centre for Evolutionary Biology & Biodiversity investigates the systematics of Australia's flora and fauna.
The Centre for Energy Technology develops technologies to reduce greenhouse gas and pollutant emissions from existing energy systems while refining alternative energy sources to reduce the effects of climate change.
 The Sprigg Geobiology Centre seeks to understand how organisms both alter and evolve in response to the environment and how they control geologic processes.
The Water Research Centre investigates the use of water across three broad themes namely, climate change, process management and human health.
 The Global Ecology Laboratory undertakes multidisciplinary research to mitigate carbon emissions and develop adaptive strategies to respond to the anticipated impacts of climate change.
The Landscape Futures Program investigates how we can sustainably create vibrant and viable landscapes into the future through sound environmental management and monitoring.
The Marine Biology Program investigates the role of aquatic flora and fauna in the connectivity and ecology of rivers, estuaries, gulfs and open coasts.

Governance 
The Environment Institute is governed by a board. As of 2014, its membership includes:
 Carl Binning – BHP
 Mike Brooks – University of Adelaide
 Pauline Gregg – Telstra
 Allan Holmes – Department of Environment, Water & Natural Resources, Government of South Australia
 Steve Morton (chair) – CSIRO
Former board members include:
 Peter Dowd – University of Adelaide
 Paul Duldig – University of Adelaide
 Robert "Bob" Hill – University of Adelaide

Associated organisations
The University of Adelaide has established a number of Research Institutes including:
 Robinson Institute in Reproductive Health
 Institute for Mineral and Energy Resources (IMER)
 Institute for Photonics and Advanced Sensing (IPAS)

Selected publications

References

External links 
 Environment Institute

Environmental research institutes
International research institutes
Research institutes in Australia
Sustainability organizations
University of Adelaide